In the Battle of Rivoli on 14 and 15 January 1797, the French Army of Italy led by Napoleon Bonaparte crushed the main Austrian army led by Jozsef Alvinczi. The battle occurred during the fourth Austrian attempt to relieve the Siege of Mantua. After crippling Alvinczi's army on the 14th, Bonaparte left Barthélemy Joubert and Gabriel Rey to finish off the Austrians and raced south with André Masséna to deal with a relief column led by Giovanni di Provera. On 16 January, Masséna, Pierre Augereau, and Jean Sérurier trapped Provera near the Mantua siege lines and forced his surrender.

France
 Army of Italy: Napoleon Bonaparte (48,610)
 Division: André Masséna (8,851 including 2 cavalry regiments)
 Brigade: Jean-Charles Monnier
 18th Demi-Brigade (1,604)
 32nd Demi-Brigade (1,848)
 Brigade: Guillaume Brune
 75th Demi-Brigade (2,373)
 25th Demi-Brigade (1,226)
 Brigade: Charles Leclerc
 1st Cavalry Regiment (216)
 15th Dragoon Regiment (203)
 18th Light Infantry Demi-Brigade (1,150)
 Artillery: 6 guns
 Division: Pierre Augereau (8,665 including 4 cavalry regiments)
 Brigade: Jean Guieu
 Brigade: François Point
 Brigade: Jean-Antoine Verdier
 Brigade: Frédéric Walther (cavalry)
 Division: Barthélemy Joubert (10,250 including 1 cavalry regiment)
 Brigade: Honoré Vial
 4th Light Infantry Demi-Brigade (792)
 17th Light Infantry Demi-Brigade (784)
 22nd Light Infantry Demi-Brigade (1,332)
 Brigade: Claude Lebley
 29th Light Infantry Brigade (1,258)
 33rd Demi-Brigade (1,965)
 85th Demi-Brigade (1,386)
 Brigade: Thomas Sandos
 14th Demi-Brigade (1,358)
 39th Demi-Brigade (978)
 22nd Light Cavalry Regiment (205)
 Artillery: 12 guns
 Division: Gabriel Rey (4,156 including 2 cavalry regiments)
 Brigade: Antoine Veaux
 8th Dragoon Regiment (207)
 12th Light Infantry Demi-Brigade (529)
 Brigade: Louis Baraguey d'Hilliers
 59th Demi-Brigade (2,814)
 11th Light Infantry Demi-Brigade (254)
 Brigade: Joachim Murat
 Guides Regiment (322)
 Artillery: 6 guns
 Division: Jean Sérurier (10,230 including 2 cavalry regiments)
 Alexandre Dumas and Claude Dallemagne each led small divisions under the supervision of Sérurier. It is unknown which brigades were assigned to each division.
 Brigade: Jean Davin
 Brigade: Sextius Miollis
 Brigade: André Monleau
 Brigade: Emmanuel de Serviez
 Brigade: Jean de La Salcette
 Reserve: Bonaparte
 Brigade: Charles Dugua (658)
 3rd Dragoon Regiment
 10th Light Cavalry Regiment
 Brigade: Claude Victor (1,800 including 1 cavalry regiment)
 Brigade: Jean Lannes (2,000)

Austria
 Field Army: FZM Jozsef Alvinczi (28,022)
 Independent columns:
 Brigade 1: OB Franz de Lusignan (4,556)
 4,556 in 4 bns and 12 coys
 Brigade 2: GM Anton Lipthay (5,065)
 5,065 in 4 bns and 6 coys
 Brigade 3: GM Samuel Köblös (4,138)
 4,138 in 5 bns and 6 coys
 Brigade 6: GM Josef Vukassovich (2,871)
 2,795 in 3 bns and 5 coys, 76 in 1/2 sqn
 Division: FML Peter Quasdanovich
 Brigade 4: GM Joseph Ocskay (3,521)
 2,692 in 4 bns, 829 in 8 sqns
 Brigade 5: GM Heinrich XV, Prince of Reuss-Plauen (7,871)
 6,986 in 9 bns, 885 in 5-1/2 sqns
 Corps at Vicenza: GM Adam Bajalics (6,241)
 6,081 in 6 bns, 160 in 1 sqn
 Corps at Padua: FML Giovanni di Provera (9,097)
 8,379 in 10 bns, 718 in 8-1/2 sqns
 Corps at Borgo Valsugana: GM Anton Mittrowsky (3,570)
 3,497 in 4 bns, 73 in 1/2 sqn
 Mantua Garrison: FM Dagobert von Wurmser (18,493, including 9,800 fit for service)

Key
 FM: Feldmarschall, army commander
 FZM: Feldzeugmeister, army or corps commander
 FML: Feldmarschal-Leutnant, corps or division commander
 GM: General-major, brigade commander
 OB: Oberst or colonel
 bns: infantry battalions
 coys: light infantry companies
 sqns: cavalry squadrons

References
 Boycott-Brown, Martin. The Road to Rivoli: Napoleon's First Campaign. London: Cassell, 2001. 
 Chandler, David. Dictionary of the Napoleonic Wars. New York: Macmillan, 1979. 
 Fiebeger, G. J. The Campaigns of Napoleon Bonaparte of 1796-1797. West Point, NY: U.S. Military Academy Printing Office, 1911. 
 Nafziger, George F. "French & Austrian Forces Battle of Rivoli 14 January 1797." 1996. Accessed April 30, 2018. https://usacac.army.mil/CAC2/CGSC/CARL/nafziger/797AAA.PDF.

Footnotes

External links
 Austrian general names by Digby Smith, compiled by Leopold Kudrna
 French general names
 Rivoli: Austrian order of battle by Stephen Millar
 French & Austrian Forces, Battle of Rivoli, 14 January 1797 by George F. Nafziger

French Revolutionary Wars orders of battle